The 2008–09 Czech Cup was the sixteenth edition of the annual football knock-out tournament of the Czech Republic. It began on 20 July 2008 with the preliminary round. The final was held on 27 May 2009.

Teams

Preliminary round

|colspan="3" style="background-color:#97DEFF"|20 July 2008

First round

|colspan="3" style="background-color:#97DEFF"|22 July 2008

|-
|colspan="3" style="background-color:#97DEFF"|23 July 2008

|-
|colspan="3" style="background-color:#97DEFF"|26 July 2008

|-
|colspan="3" style="background-color:#97DEFF"|27 July 2008

Second round

|colspan="3" style="background-color:#97DEFF"|2 August 2008

|-
|colspan="3" style="background-color:#97DEFF"|5 August 2008

|-
|colspan="3" style="background-color:#97DEFF"|27 August 2008

|-
|colspan="3" style="background-color:#97DEFF"|2 September 2008

|-
|colspan="3" style="background-color:#97DEFF"|3 September 2008

 

|-
|colspan="3" style="background-color:#97DEFF"|4 September 2008

|-
|colspan="3" style="background-color:#97DEFF"|9 September 2008

Third round

|colspan="3" style="background-color:#97DEFF"|23 September 2008

|-
|colspan="3" style="background-color:#97DEFF"|24 September 2008

|-
|colspan="3" style="background-color:#97DEFF"|25 September 2008

|-
|colspan="3" style="background-color:#97DEFF"|30 September 2008

|-
|colspan="3" style="background-color:#97DEFF"|1 October 2008

|-
|colspan="3" style="background-color:#97DEFF"|7 October 2008

Fourth round

|colspan="3" style="background-color:#97DEFF"|22 October 2008

|-
|colspan="3" style="background-color:#97DEFF"|28 October 2008

|-
|colspan="3" style="background-color:#97DEFF"|29 October 2008

 
|-
|colspan="3" style="background-color:#97DEFF"|30 October 2008

Quarterfinals
The first legs were played on 8 and 9 April 2009. The second legs were played on 22 and 23 April 2009.

Semifinals
The first legs were played on 6 and 7 May 2009. The second legs were played on 13 May 2009.

Final

See also
 2008–09 Czech First League
 2008–09 Czech 2. Liga

References
 Czech Republic Cup 2008/09 at RSSSF.com
 Official site 
 soccerway.com
 worldfootball.net

2008-09
2008–09 domestic association football cups
Cup